This is a list of protected areas of Alberta. Protected areas are managed by the Government of Canada or the Government of Alberta. The provincial government owns 60% of Alberta's landmass but most of this has not been formally protected.


International recognition 
Six of Canada's 14 UNESCO World Heritage Sites are entirely or partially located in Alberta: 

 Canadian Rocky Mountain Parks (shared with British Columbia) 
 Dinosaur Provincial Park
 Head-Smashed-In Buffalo Jump
 Waterton-Glacier International Peace Park (shared with Montana, United States)
 Wood Buffalo National Park (shared with Northwest Territories)
 Writing-on-Stone Provincial Park

Alberta also contains the following UNESCO Biosphere Reserves
 Waterton Biosphere Reserve (since 1979)
 Beaver Hills Biosphere Reserve (since 2016)

Federally protected areas 
Five National Parks of Canada (Banff, Elk Island, Jasper, Waterton Lakes and Wood Buffalo), managed by Parks Canada are located in the province.  Several former national parks (such Buffalo National Park, Wawaskesy National Park, and Nemiskam National Park) formerly existed in Alberta, but were delisted in 1947.

There are several National Historic Sites of Canada in Alberta, but only two are operated by Parks Canada: Rocky Mountain House, which features an indoor interpretation centre and year-round in-person interpretation, and Frog Lake which has only outdoor interpretive panels to mark the site.

Alberta is also home to Suffield National Wildlife Area, a protected area within the military reserve at CFB Suffield.

Provincially protected areas 
There are several different departments and agencies that deal with land use in Alberta, however Alberta's provincial parks are managed by Alberta Parks, which since 2022 is part of the Ministry of Forestry, Parks and Tourism whose mandate is to protect the province's natural landscapes in Alberta, as well as the Ministry of Environment and Protected Areas.  Seven categories of protection exist, provincial parks being one. These categories are:
 
 Ecological reserves
 Wilderness areas
 Wildland provincial parks
 Provincial parks 
 Natural areas 
 Heritage rangelands  
 Provincial recreation areas

, the province of Alberta managed 76 provincial parks, 32 wildland provincial parks, 208 provincial recreation areas, 15 ecological reserves, 3 wilderness areas, 139 natural areas and 2 heritage rangeland. Although these areas are the responsibility of the Alberta government,  private companies have been contracted to handle various aspects of the operation of many parks (e.g. maintenance and campground operation).

List of wilderness areas 
Wilderness areas have the strictest level of protection, no development of any kind is permitted, and travel is only permitted by foot.
 Ghost River Wilderness Area
 Siffleur Wilderness Area
 White Goat Wilderness Area
 Willmore Wilderness Park

List of provincial parks

Other parks 
Birch Mountains Wildland (wildland)
Caribou Mountains Wildland Park (wildland)
Chinchaga Wildland Park (wildland)
Dillon River Wildland Park (wildland)
Fidler-Greywillow Wildland Park (wildland)
Gipsy-Gordon Wildland Park (wildland)
Hay-Zama Lakes (wildland)
Kakwa Wildlands Park (wildland)
Kananaskis Country (not a park but a provincially run tract of land containing several parks)
Kazan Wildland Park (wildland)
Richardson Wildland Park (wildland)

Other provincial lands 
Approximately 60% of land in Alberta is public land owned by the Alberta government.  For administrative purposes, the province is divided into two broad land use areas: the Green Area (forested land, almost entirely provincially owned) and the White Area (other).  The Rocky Mountains Forest Reserve was created by the Forest Reserves Act of 1964.  There are also 32 provincial grazing reserves located throughout Alberta. They are administered by Alberta Sustainable Resource Development.

Municipal parks

See also
List of Canadian provincial parks
List of provincial parks in Alberta
List of National Parks of Canada
Buffalo National Park (delisted national park)

References

External links
About Alberta's Parks
Alberta Parks -list of provincial parks
Alberta Community Development - Parks and Protected Areas Land Reference Manual

Alberta
Protected areas